The 2014 Dodge City Law season was the team's first season as a professional indoor football franchise and only season as a member of the Champions Professional Indoor Football League (CPIFL). One of nine teams in the CPIFL for the 2014 season, the Law were owned and operated by Ricky Bertz. The Law played their home games at the United Wireless Arena in Dodge City, Kansas, under the direction of head coach Sean Ponder.

Season summary
The Law began its inaugural season with a road win over the Omaha Beef. The team lost the next two games but regained its footing to win 6 of the following 7 contests. A home loss to the Wichita Wild and a win over the faltering Kansas Koyotes rounded out the regular season. The Law finished with an 8–4 record, 4th best in the league and good enough to put the team in the playoffs. They lost their semi-final game to eventual league champion Wichita Wild 31–33. After the season ended, the CPIFL announced it was merging with teams from other leagues to form Champions Indoor Football.

Schedule
Key:

Regular season

Playoffs

Roster

References

External links
Dodge City Law at Our Sports Central

Season 2014
Dodge City 2014
Dodge City Law